The 1981 season was the fourth in the history of Newcastle KB United. It was also the fourth season in the National Soccer League. In addition to the domestic league, they also participated in the NSL Cup. Newcastle KB United finished 10th in their National Soccer League season, and were eliminated in the NSL Cup first round by Canberra City.

Players

Competitions

Overview

National Soccer League

League table

Results by round

Matches

NSL Cup

Statistics

Appearances and goals
Players with no appearances not included in the list.

Clean sheets

References

Newcastle KB United seasons